Guarda is a former municipality in Inn District in the Swiss canton of Graubünden.  On 1 January 2015 the former municipalities of Ardez, Guarda, Tarasp, Ftan and Sent merged into the municipality of Scuol.

Guarda was awarded the Wakker Prize for the preservation of its architectural heritage in 1975.

History
Guarda is first mentioned in 1160 as Warda. Between 1939 and 1945 a major building renovation was carried on in Guarda which was conducted by the Swiss architect Iachen Ulrich Könz.

Geography

Of this area, 35.5% is used for agricultural purposes, while 12.5% is forested. Of the rest of the land, 0.7% is settled (buildings or roads) and the remainder (51.4%) is non-productive (rivers, glaciers or mountains).

The former municipality is located in the Sur Tasna sub-district of the Inn district on a terrace above the left bank of the Inn river.  It consists of the linear village of Guarda above the valley and the settlement of Giarsun along the valley floor.

Demographics
Guarda had a population (as of 2014) of 155.  , 13.5% of the population was made up of foreign nationals.  Over the last 10 years the population has decreased at a rate of -13.4%.

, the gender distribution of the population was 49.7% male and 50.3% female.  The age distribution, in Guarda is; 8 children or 5.6% of the population are between 0 and 9 years old.  9 teenagers or 6.3% are 10 to 14, and 7 teenagers or 4.9% are 15 to 19.  Of the adult population, 16 people or 11.1% of the population are between 20 and 29 years old.  13 people or 9.0% are 30 to 39, 28 people or 19.4% are 40 to 49, and 17 people or 11.8% are 50 to 59.  The senior population distribution is 13 people or 9.0% of the population are between 60 and 69 years old, 21 people or 14.6% are 70 to 79, there are 12 people or 8.3% who are 80 to 89.

In the 2007 federal election the most popular party was the SVP which received 46.3% of the vote.  The next three most popular parties were the SPS (35%), the CVP (8.7%) and the FDP (7.4%).

The entire Swiss population is generally well educated.  In Guarda about 77.3% of the population (between age 25-64) have completed either non-mandatory upper secondary education or additional higher education (either university or a Fachhochschule).

Guarda has an unemployment rate of 1.83%.  , there were 27 people employed in the primary economic sector and about 12 businesses involved in this sector.  19 people are employed in the secondary sector and there are 8 businesses in this sector.  56 people are employed in the tertiary sector, with 14 businesses in this sector.

The historical population is given in the following table:

Wakker Prize

In 1975 the Swiss Heritage Society awarded Guarda the Wakker Prize for the preservation of its architectural heritage.  The award notes that it is one of the best preserved and characteristic villages of the Unterengadin.  It notes that the municipality struggled with a harsh landscape and the demands of tourism as well as the migration of young people from the village into the cities of Switzerland.

Languages

Most of the population speaks Rhaeto-Romance (62.5%), with German  being second most common (30.6%) and French being third (2.8%).  The majority of the population speaks the Vallader dialect of Romansh.  Until the 1980s, the village was almost totally Romansh speaking (1880 96%, 1900 99%, 1941 91% and 1980 90%).   While the village school still supports the Romansh language, the German-speaking population is growing in Guarda.

References

External links

Scuol
Former municipalities of Graubünden
Populated places disestablished in 2015